Hen Ezra (born 19 January 1989) is an Israeli footballer who plays as an attacking midfielder for Maccabi Netanya.

Career
Ezra played in the youth teams of Hapoel Be'er Sheva and Beitar Tubruk. In 2007, he moved to Maccabi Netanya, and the following season was loaned to Hapoel Kfar Saba to gain experience in that season he finished with 4 goals and 3 assists in summer 2009 he returned to Maccabi Netanya.

Breakthrough season: 2011–12

In summer 2011 Ezra was closed in Maccabi Haifa, but eventually stayed in Netanya.
under the guidance of Reuven Atar Ezra excelled in all games playing in the left winger position He scored his first goal of the new season in a 6–2 win against Hapoel Rishon LeZion in which he added another goal and  had a terrific match Ezra then continued his fine season by scoring another 10 goals and assists 3 Ezra was heavily praised by the Israeli media this season.

Maccabi Haifa
In June 2012 he moved to Maccabi Haifa for a fee of $1,000,000 and a four years contract worth approximately $700,000
In 2012/2013 season he played for Maccabi Haifa Ezra excelled under the guidance of coach Arik Benado (that replaced Reuven Atar) finishing the season with 9 goals and 14 assists and was selected "Team of the season" of Ma'ariv.

International
He has played for the Israel national side at U17, U18, U19, and senior level, and was a part of the U21 squad (although he never won a cap).
On September 7, 2012 Ezra made his debut on the national team, when he played in the game against Azerbaijan in 2014 FIFA World Cup qualifiers.
On June 2, 2013 he scored his debut goal, in a friendly match against Honduras.

Club career statistics
(correct )

Honours

Club
Maccabi Haifa
Israeli Premier League Runner-up (1): 2012–13
Israel State Cup (1): 2015–16

Individual
Israeli Premier League – 2012–13 Most assists (13)

International goals
Scores and results list Israel's goal tally first.

References

1989 births
Living people
Israeli footballers
Beitar Nes Tubruk F.C. players
Maccabi Netanya F.C. players
Hapoel Kfar Saba F.C. players
Maccabi Haifa F.C. players
Hapoel Tel Aviv F.C. players
Beitar Jerusalem F.C. players
Hapoel Be'er Sheva F.C. players
AC Omonia players
Israeli Premier League players
Liga Leumit players
Cypriot First Division players
Israeli people of Iraqi-Jewish descent
Footballers from Beersheba
Expatriate footballers in Cyprus
Israeli expatriate sportspeople in Cyprus
Association football midfielders
Israel international footballers